Grant Connell and Patrick Galbraith were the defending champions but lost in the semifinals 3–6, 4–6 against Jacco Eltingh and Paul Haarhuis the eventual champions.

Draw

Final

Top half

Bottom half

References 
Main draw results

Doubles
1995 Eurocard Open